Akko is a local government area of Gombe, Gombe State, Nigeria. Its headquarters is in Kumo town on the A345 highway south of the state capital Gombe, about 40 km away. Kumo (headquarters) is a cosmopolitan community of more than 30 different tribes, ranging from the dominant  Fulani tribe to Tangale, Tera, Hausa and other minorities.

Kumo  also serves as the second-largest in the state centre after Gombe Local Government, in thecal government area is made up of three major districts and 11 wards. Akko LGA was created for the main purpose of establishing link between the people at the grassroots, state and the central government levels.

Akko Local Government Area Secretariat, Kumo, Gombe state, Nigeria Akko local government is under Gombe state, and the current governor is Alhaji Muhammad Inuwa Yahaya, is governing under All Progressives Congress (APC)   political party. 

The Chairman of Akko local government is Akhaji Abubakar Usaman.

Akko Local Government Area is located in Kumo town and this area council consists of Gona, Kumo, Pindiga, Garin Garba, Jalingo,  Jauro Tukur,  Kembu, Kumo North, Kumo East, Panda, Kumo Central, Lergo, Garin Liman Kumo, Mararraban-Tum, Tashan Magarya, and many more.

 
The local government area covers 2,627 km2 and had a population of 337,853 at the 2006 census.

The postal code of the area is 771102 to 771104 .

Ther are about 100 secondary schools in Akko LGA.

Government 

The local government Chairman and Deputy Chairman are Abubakar Usman Barambu and Mahmud Saleh Tabra respectively. They are both from the All Progressive Congress political  party.

Market days 

As in most northern states of Nigeria, there is much agricultural activity including the following:

 Tomatoes
 Sorghum
 Maize
 Millet
 Beans
 Groundnut
 Cotton
 Gum Arabic

Most of this produce finds its way into the local markets with specific days allotted for towns and villages:

 Monday: Garko, Pindiga & Kalshingi
 Tuesday: Kashere
 Wednesday: None
 Thursday: Kumo
 Friday: Kembu
 Saturday: Tumu, Kalshingi
 Sunday: Tukulma

References

 
 

Local Government Areas in Gombe State